Charles Marvin may refer to:

 Charles Marvin (coach) (born c. 1928), American football and baseball coach
 Charles Marvin (Connecticut politician) (1804–1883), American politician in Connecticut
 Charles A. Marvin (1929–2003), district attorney and state circuit court judge in North Louisiana
 Charles F. Marvin (1858–1943), American meteorologist
 Charles Thomas Marvin (1854–1890), writer on Russia